Ash (Ashley) Marinaccio (born January 9, 1985) is a documentarian, artistic director, theatre director, photographer, filmmaker, performer, and playwright. She works across disciplines and mediums in nonfiction storytelling. 

She is the founder and founding Artistic Director of Project Girl Performance Collective, which rebranded in 2011 under the name of Girl Be Heard. The mission of the organization is to provide young women with a platform to create theatre around pressing feminist and socio-political issues. Under her leadership, Girl Be Heard has received international attention, awards and accolades for its  theatre productions that place the stories of young women at the forefront of the work. In 2012, she gave a TEDx talk at Columbia University's TEDxTeachersCollege entitled "Give it Up for Rush Limbaugh", about her career trajectory and work with Girl Be Heard. In 2013, she was the youngest artistic director to receive the Lucille Lortel Women's Visionary Award from the League of Professional Theatre Women. Marinaccio left Girl Be Heard in 2016.

Marinaccio is the creator and host of the digital documentary series Stage Left, which was expected to debut in 2021. Stage Left examines the impact of theatre and performance on local communities. She is the creator, host and director of several episodes.

She is a co-founder of Co-Op Theatre East alongside Robert A.K. Gonyo and Casey Cleverly. Co-Op Theatre East is a New York City-based theatre company that works to create theatre that challenges the socio-political status quo. Notable works with Co-Op Theatre East have included the 2010 production of 'My Name is Rachel Corrie at the Kraine Theatre in New York City's East Village which utilized two actresses in the title role of Rachel Corrie.

In 2021 Marinaccio created Docbloc, a New York based performing arts organization dedicated to nonfiction storytelling. The mission of Docbloc is to experiment with documentary form and bring together artists working across nonfiction mediums for collaborations and conversation in live performance. 

She is an alumna of the Lincoln Center Directors Lab, Hemispheric Institute's EMERGENYC, BAM/Kennedy Center's Professional Development Program, Old Vic/New Voices Directing Lab, American Theatre Wing's Springboard NYC, and The Civilians Field Research Team.

Marinaccio completed her BA in theatre directing and sociology/anthropology at Pace University in 2007, her MA in Performance Studies from NYU's Tisch School of the Arts in 2008. She is currently a Ph.D. Candidate in Theatre and Performance at the CUNY Graduate Center. Her scholarly research examines documentary theatre, the role of theatre in war zones, and practical applications of theatre in times of conflict. Marinaccio has contributed to numerous scholarly publications as a writer and photographer. She has been a member of the theatre, media, and performing arts faculty at Pace University's School of Performing Arts, The Actors Studio, Queens College, and at Hunter College.

Works

Directing 
Some of her directing credits include: 
 2021 documentary theatre project 20 Years Later 
 2020 digital documentary series Stage Left
2020 documentary short film Flatten the Curve 
2017 world premiere workshop of Raw Nerve a new play about Aaron Swartz in New York City 
 2016 world premiere production of Embodi(ED) at HERE
 2016 production of Embodi(ED) at the United Nations Commission on the Status of Women
 Patrick Cleary's Parthenogenesis in the New York International Fringe Festival
 2015 world premiere of Under One Sun at the Wild Project in New York City, and Bosnian Cultural Center in Bosnia and Herzegovina 
 2014 Global Summit to End Sexual Violence in Conflict Zones closing night plenary Girl Be Heard performance, co-chaired by William Hague and Angelina Jolie 
 2014 European tour of Trafficked and 9mm America (London, Geneva and Copenhagen)  
 2013 production of Eve Ensler's The Vagina Monologues in Harlem apartment building with Co-Op Theatre East 
 2013 world premiere of 9mm America in New York City in the Planet Connections Festivity (13 Award Nominations, Winner of Outstanding Production and Planet Activist)  
 2012 world premiere of Trafficked in the Planet Connections Festivity (11 Award Nominations, Winner of Outstanding Directing and Planet Activist) 
 2011 production of Project Girl: Congo with Girl Be Heard at the White House and the United Nations 
 World premieres of Girl Power: Voices of a Generation and Girl Power: Survival of the Fittest in the New York International Fringe Festival

Playwriting 
Some of her playwriting credits include: 
 Contributor to Raw Nerve (2017)
 Decadent Acts (2010, 2011 and 2017 at Dixon Place) 
 There Are No Camels in Beirut, an autobiographical play about her experiences in the 2006 Lebanon War (debuted in 2015 at The Culture Project)
 Live from Pod 305, short play which debuted in Manhattan Theatre Source's 2011 Estrogenius Festival and is featured in the 2011 Book of Estro

Other Writing 
 Authored "The Paranormal Northeast" in Frommer's 2007 MTV Road Trips

Acting 
 Hailey Boyes on The Onion News Network

References

Links
http://www.ashley-marinaccio.com - Official web site
http://www.introublewiththeking.com - Photography web site 
http://www.imdb.com/name/nm4447501/
http://www.girlbeheard.org
http://www.cooptheatreeast.org
http://www.ashley-marinaccio.com  
https://www.youtube.com/watch?v=mKkCaJ4tKf8 
https://www.amazon.com/MTV-Road-Trips-U-S-A-Guides/dp/0764587765
https://www.createspace.com/4121455

1985 births
Living people
American theatre directors
Women theatre directors
American dramatists and playwrights
Graduate Center, CUNY alumni
Tisch School of the Arts alumni
Pace University alumni
People from Long Branch, New Jersey
Red Bank Regional High School alumni